The University of Michigan Center for Digital Curricula is an educational  research center at the University of Michigan, College of Engineering, in Ann Arbor, Michigan dedicated to the development of deeply-digital, open educational resources.

History 
In 2019 professors Elliot Soloway and Cathie Norris founded the Center for Digital Curricula under the auspices of the University of Michigan, College of Engineering, for the purposes of building deeply-digital open curricula. These curricula, composed by the Center's team of educators, are designed to be delivered through the Collabrify Roadmap Platform,  a software platform first developed in the mid 2010s.   

Roadmaps - the visual format for the deeply-digital lessons - have been produced at the University of Michigan College of Engineering.  Currently, the Center provides standards-aligned curricula for K-5, all 4 core subjects (ELA, math, science, social studies). The Roadmap lessons use the Collabrify Suite of Productivity Tools in supporting highly-interactive, engaging, lessons. The Suite includes: Collabrify Multimedia Writer (writing with text, video, audio, images), Collabrify Flipbook (drawing, animating), Collabrify Venn (Venn diagramming, Collabrify Chart (spreadsheeting), Collabrify Map (concept mapping), Collabrify PDFpal (editing PDF files). All apps are "collabrified" - they support synchronous collaboration.

Due to the demand for digital education as a result of the COVID-19 pandemic, the Center for Digital Curricula began offering their products freely to school districts across the United States.

References

Engineering
Educational institutions established in 2019
2019 establishments in Michigan
University of Michigan campus